Talab may refer to:

Bakshi Ka Talab, residential area in Uttar Pradesh, India
Gol Talab, small oval-shaped water tank/pond in Islampur, Old Dhaka, Dhaka, Bangladesh
Talab al-Qawasmi, Palestinian politician
Talab Tillo, suburban area of Jammu City in the State of Jammu and Kashmir
 Talab, alternate name of Tarlab, a village in Iran

See also
Ta'lab, the moon god

de:Talab